David Raynal (26 July 1840 – 28 January 1903) was a French politician of the French Third Republic. He was a member of the Chamber of Deputies of France (1879–1897) and Senate of France (1897–1903). He was twice minister of public works (14 January 1881 – 30 January 1882; 21 February 1883 – 6 April 1885) in the governments of Léon Gambetta and Jules Ferry. He was minister of the interior (3 December 1893 – 30 May 1894) in the government of Jean Casimir-Perier.

References

Sources 
 André Bénac, Conférence sur la vie et l'œuvre politique de David Raynal, 1925
 Pierre Birnbaum, Les Fous de la République: Histoire politique des Juifs d'État, de Gambetta à Vichy, 1992

External links 
 Fiche sur Assemblée nationale
 Fiche sur Sénat

1840 births
1903 deaths
Politicians from Paris
Jewish French politicians
French republicans
French interior ministers
Members of the 2nd Chamber of Deputies of the French Third Republic
Members of the 3rd Chamber of Deputies of the French Third Republic
Members of the 4th Chamber of Deputies of the French Third Republic
Members of the 5th Chamber of Deputies of the French Third Republic
Members of the 6th Chamber of Deputies of the French Third Republic
French Senators of the Third Republic
Senators of Gironde